Avicennia marina, commonly known as grey mangrove or white mangrove, is a species of mangrove tree classified in the plant family Acanthaceae (formerly in the Verbenaceae or Avicenniaceae). As with other mangroves, it occurs in the intertidal zones of estuarine areas.

Description
The habit is a gnarled arrangement of multiple branches. It has smooth light-grey bark made up of thin, stiff, brittle flakes. This may be whitish, a characteristic described in the common name. These allow the plant to absorb oxygen, which is deficient in its habitat. These roots also anchor the plant during the frequent inundation of seawater in the soft substrate of tidal systems. The fruit contains large cotyledons that surround the new stem of a seedling. This produces a large, fleshy seed, often germinating on the tree and falling as a seedling. The grey mangrove can experience stunted growth in water conditions that are too saline, but thrive to their full height in waters where both salt and fresh water are present. The species can tolerate high salinity by excreting salts through its leaves.

The grey mangrove is a highly variable tree, with a number of ecotypes, and in forms closely resembling other species. It has been reported to tolerate extreme weather conditions, high winds, and various pests and diseases. It is a pioneer in muddy soil conditions with a pH value of 6.5 to 8.0, but is intolerant of shade.

Subdivision
A number of botanists have proposed division of the species, but currently three subspecies and one variety are recognised:
A. m. subsp. australasica (Walp.) J.Everett
A. m. subsp. eucalyptifolia (Valeton) J.Everett
A. m. subsp. marina
A. m. var. rumphiana (Hallier f.) Bakh., syn. Avicennia lanata Ridl., Avicennia rumphiana Hallier f.

Distribution
It is distributed along Africa's east coast, south-west, south and south-east Asia, Australia, and northern parts of New Zealand.  It is one of the few mangroves found in the arid regions of the coastal Arabian Peninsula, mainly in sabkha environments in the United Arab Emirates, Qatar, Bahrain, Oman, as well as in similar environments on both side of the Red Sea (in Yemen, Saudi Arabia, Egypt, Eritrea, and Sudan), and Qatar and southern Iran along the Persian Gulf coast. It is a characteristic species of the Southern Africa mangroves ecoregion, and is one of three species present in Africa's southernmost mangroves, in the estuary of South Africa's Nahoon River at 32°56′S. The species is also found in Somalia.

Australia
In Australia it occurs in every mainland state and extends much farther south than other mangroves, with its southern most limit at Corner Inlet (38 degrees south) near Wilson's Promontory in Victoria. Its distribution is disjunct in Western Australia; the population of the Abrolhos Islands is  further south than the nearest population of Shark Bay. Another mangrove system is found even further south at Bunbury. This colonisation of southerly climes may have occurred relatively recently, perhaps several thousand years ago, when they were transferred by the Leeuwin Current. In South Australia along the Barker Inlet and Port River in Gulf St Vincent, as well as in sheltered bays in Spencer Gulf and the west coast of Eyre Peninsula, A. marina forests form hatcheries for much of the state's fish and shellfish commercial and recreational fisheries.

New Zealand
In New Zealand, Avicennia marina is the only mangrove species. It grows in the top half of the North Island, between 34 and 38 degrees south. Avicennia marina was known in New Zealand as Avicennia resinifera until recently; its Māori name is mānawa.

References

Further reading
 
 .

External links

marina
Mangroves
Afrotropical realm flora
Australasian realm flora
Indomalayan realm flora
Central Indo-Pacific flora
Western Indo-Pacific flora
Flora of East Tropical Africa
Flora of Northeast Tropical Africa
Flora of the Arabian Peninsula
Flora of the Western Indian Ocean
Flora of Egypt
Flora of Mozambique
Flora of tropical Asia
Trees of Australia
Trees of New Zealand
Trees of South Africa
Trees of the Pacific
Eudicots of Western Australia
Lamiales of Australia
Natural history of Balochistan, Pakistan
Taxa named by Peter Forsskål
Plants described in 1775